General Bagration may refer to:

Dmitry Bagration (1863–1919), Imperial Russian Army lieutenant general
Ivan Vakhushtovich Bagration (1725–1781), Imperial Russian Army lieutenant general
Kiril Bagration (1749–1828), Imperial Russian Army major general
Pyotr Romanovich Bagration (1818–1876), Imperial Russian Army lieutenant general
Pyotr Bagration (1765–1812), Imperial Russian Army general of the infantry
Roman Bagration (1778–1834), Imperial Russian Army lieutenant general

See also
Alexander Bagration-Imeretinsky (1796–1862), Imperial Russian Army general of the cavalry
Dmitry Bagration-Imeretinsky (1799–1845), Imperial Russian Army major general